Veselin Savić (born 22 September 1989) is a Serbian rower.

He won a gold medal at the 2011 World Rowing U23 Championships in men's coxed four and posted U23 world record.

External links

1989 births
Living people
Serbian male rowers
European champions for Serbia
European Rowing Championships medalists